The 2006 Harrogate Council election took place on 4 May 2006 to elect members of Harrogate Borough Council in North Yorkshire, England. One third of the council was up for election and the Conservative party lost overall control of the council to no overall control.

After the election, the composition of the council was
Conservative 27
Liberal Democrat 22
Independent 5

Background
Before the election the Conservatives controlled the council with 29 of the 54 seats. 19 seats were contested in the election, with the Conservatives defending 8, the Liberal Democrats 9 and independents 2. The Conservatives stood in every ward, while the Liberal Democrats contested 18 of the 19 wards. A Conservative cabinet member Alan Skidmore stepped down as a councillor at the election after previously representing Ripon Spa ward.

Election result
The results saw the Conservatives lose their majority on the council after losing 3 seats. They finished with 27 seats, half of the 54 seats, after Bilton and Knaresborough King James were gained by the Liberal Democrats. The Conservatives also lost another seat in Ripon to an independent, but did gain High Harrogate from the Liberal Democrats. This meant the Liberal Democrats ended with 22 seats and there were 5 independents, after the independents won all 3 seats in Ripon. Overall turnout was nearly 40%, a little above the national average.

Ward results

References

2006
2006 English local elections
2000s in North Yorkshire